Ilseongnok or Diary of Self-examination is a daily record of events at court made in order that the monarch might reflect upon them, ostensibly towards bettering government. Ilseongnok began as King Jeongjo's personal diary for self-reflection on his personal and academic affairs since his youth, but was transformed into an official daily journal of state affairs in 1785. The extant record of the Ilseongnok covers the last 150 years of the Joseon dynasty, from 1760 (the 36th year of the reign of King Yeongjo) to the end of the Joseon dynasty in 1910. The Ilseongnok is a vital historical record, and along with the Joseon Wangjo Sillok, the Seungjeongwon ilgi, and the Bibyeonsa Teungrok, constitutes one of the primary historical sources for the study of the period.

On December 31, 1973, it was designated as the 153rd national treasure of Korea. In May 2011, it was listed in UNESCO's Memory of the World registry.

Comparison and evaluation with Veritable Records 

 The Veritable Records was not as helpful to the kings because the kings were not permitted to read it without supervision, but the Ilseongnok can be viewed by the kings and can help kings on reporting and referring to the administration of state affairs, etc.
 Veritable Records was based on the position of the editor and the ruling party in the process of restructuring based on Sacho(사초). Ilseongnok, on the other hand, is a record of daily work at that time, and can be a more fundamental resource than Veritable Records.

See also 
Annals of the Joseon Dynasty (Joseon Wangjo Sillok)
Seungjeongwon ilgi
Uigwe
History of Korea
Joseon Dynasty politics

References

External links
 Online version (in Korean) (Kyujanggak)

Joseon dynasty works
History books about Korea
Memory of the World Register
Chinese-language literature of Korea